Maciej Franz  (born 1969 in Toruń) is a Polish historian; the expert of the sea wars and Zaporozhian Hosts wars; professor at Adam Mickiewicz University in Poznań.

He was born in Toruń, but he moved to Poznań on the time of studies and settled here. He finished the Department of History on Adam Mickiewicz University. In 1993–2007 years taught at general education secondary school in Bolechowo near Poznań. He taught the history of the military on the department of the history in the Adam Mickiewicz University. He is the member of Instytut im. gen. Stefana Grota Roweckiego in Leszno and the solid co - worker of the quarterly "Okręty Wojenne".

In 2019 he gained the title of professor.

Scientific titles
 Habilitation – (7 November 2007)
 Doctorate (since 7 June 1999): Wojskowość Kozaczyzny Zaporoskiej. (Geneza i charakter), Uniwersytet im. Adama Mickiewicza; Wydział Historyczny; Instytut Historii, 1999

More important scientific publications
 Fáa di Bruno. Najbrzydszy okręt wojenny świata, Wydawnictwo Uniwersytetu im. A. Mickiewicza w Poznaniu, 2019
 Wojskowość Kozaczyzny Zaporoskiej. (Geneza i charakter), Toruń 2002
 Rosyjskie okręty lotnicze do 1941 roku, [w:] Okręty Wojenne, Tarnowskie Góry 2002;
 Bitwy pod Żółtymi Wodami i Korsuniem – kampania hetmana wielkiego koronnego Mikołaja Potockiego na Ukrainie w 1648 roku, [w:] Historia bliższa i dalsza.
 Polityka – Społeczeństwo – Wojskowość. Studia z historii powszechnej i Polski, Poznań–Kalisz 2001

Books
 Wojskowość Kozaczyzny Zaporoskiej w XVI-XVII wieku
 Amerykańskie lotniskowce LEXINGTON i SARATOGA
 Mare Integrans. Studia nad dziejami wybrzeży Morza Bałtyckiego
 Idea państwa kozackiego na ziemiach ukraińskich w XVI–XVII wieku

References

External links
  The people of the science
  Bio

1969 births
Living people
People from Toruń
20th-century Polish historians
Polish male non-fiction writers
21st-century Polish historians
Academic staff of Adam Mickiewicz University in Poznań